George Gorleku is a retired soccer defender from Ghana. He played professionally in the American Soccer League and Major Indoor Soccer League.

Gorleku attended Eastern Illinois University where he played on the men's soccer team from 1975 to 1978.  He earned All American honors each of his four seasons, first team in 1976 and 1978, second team in 1975 and honorable mention (third team) in 1977.  He was inducted into the school's Athletic Hall of Fame in 2005.

The Seattle Sounders drafted Gorleku in 1980, but did not sign him.  He instead began his professional career with the Pennsylvania Stoners of the American Soccer League.  He was the 1980 ASL MVP.  That year the Stoners defeated the Sacramento Spirits, 2–1, for the league championship.  Gorleku and Rich Reice scored for the Stoners.  He then played for the Chicago Horizon and Buffalo Stallions in the Major Indoor Soccer League.

Yearly Awards
1980 - ASL MVP

References

External links
EIU Panthers
MISL stats

1955 births
American Soccer League (1933–1983) players
Buffalo Stallions players
Chicago Horizons players
Eastern Illinois Panthers men's soccer players
Expatriate soccer players in the United States
Ghanaian footballers
Ghanaian expatriate footballers
Major Indoor Soccer League (1978–1992) players
Pennsylvania Stoners players
Living people
Place of birth missing (living people)
All-American men's college soccer players
Association football defenders